Avicularioidea is a clade of mygalomorph spiders, one of the two main clades into which mygalomorphs are divided (the other being the Atypoidea). It has been treated at the rank of superfamily.

Taxonomy
The division of the Mygalomorphae into two clades, Atypoidea and Avicularioidea, has been established in many studies. Avicularioidea has been treated as a superfamily (at one time including all mygalomorph spiders), although other authors have placed superfamilies, such as Theraphosoidea, within Avicularioidea. The name is based on the family name "Aviculariidae", a junior synonym of Theraphosidae, ultimately deriving from the genus Avicularia.

The Atypoidea retain some vestiges of abdominal segmentation in the form of dorsal tergites; the Avicularioidea lack these. Relationships within the Avicularioidea are not settled . Some established families have been shown not to be monophyletic. In 2018, the family Hexathelidae was split up, and three new families created within the Avicularioidea: Atracidae, Macrothelidae, and Porrhothelidae. Further changes are possible in the future.

Families
The families included in the Avicularoidea  are:

 Actinopodidae
 Atracidae – Australian funnel-web spiders
 Barychelidae – brushed trapdoor spiders
 Ctenizidae
 Cyrtaucheniidae – wafer trapdoor spiders
 Dipluridae – curtain-web spiders
 Euctenizidae
 Halonoproctidae
 Hexathelidae
 Idiopidae – armoured trapdoor spiders
 Macrothelidae
 Microstigmatidae
 Migidae – tree trapdoor spiders
 Nemesiidae
 Paratropididae – baldlegged spiders
 Porrhothelidae
 Theraphosidae – tarantulas

Also included is the extinct family Fossilcalcaridae (Cretaceous) and the incertae sedis genera Cretamygale (Cretaceous) and Rosamygale (Triassic).

References

Mygalomorphae
Arachnid superfamilies